Neotheater is the third studio album by American pop band AJR. It was released on April 26, 2019, by the band's label AJR Productions. The album was self-produced by the trio.

Background and release
The 12 tracks were collectively described as "a coming of age tale that hears the band coming to terms with the sacrifices that come with growing older now that they are in their 20s". A description of the album also stated: "The buoyant and uplifting music is juxtaposed with darker lyrical narratives that touch on anxiety, naivete and searching for integrity."

This album contained two official singles, and two promotional singles. AJR released the lead single "100 Bad Days" on January 29, 2019. They also released two promotional singles "Birthday Party" on March 12, 2019, and "Dear Winter" on April 5, 2019. "Dear Winter" was later released as the second official single on August 19, 2019. On October 25, 2019 they released "Dear Winter 2.0," an alternate version of the original song with added instruments.

Commercial performance
Neotheater debuted at number eight on the US Billboard 200 with 32,000 album-equivalent units (of which 22,000 were pure album sales). It is AJR's highest-peaking and first US top 10 album.

Critical reception

The album received favorable to mixed reviews. Rolling Stone wrote in par, citing the bubbly tracks stepped in light orchestration, crisp hooks, and the social commentary, while AllMusic says that the album is "never less than refreshing".

Track listing
All tracks are written by Jack Met and Ryan Met. All tracks are produced by Ryan Met.

Notes
 "Birthday Party" features a sample of the song "In Heaven", written by Peter Ivers and David Lynch and performed by Laurel Near in the 1977 film Eraserhead.
Ryan Met is credited with writing two of the songs on this album by himself. One of those songs is "Dear Winter". Jack Met further discusses the origins of this song at 18:30 - 22:37 of source 7.

Personnel
Credits adapted from the album's liner notes.

AJR
 Adam Met – vocals, bass guitar, programming, samples, percussion
 Jack Met – lead vocals, guitar, melodica, ukulele, drums, percussion, keyboards, synthesizers, samples, programming, trumpet, composition
 Ryan Met – vocals, programming, keyboards, ukulele, trumpet, production, composition

Additional personnel

Daniel Rosenfeld – audio editing, composing
Maikel Valdama – audio editing, mixing
 Drew Allsbrook – bass guitar 
 Chris Berry – drums 
 Chris Cerrato – design
 Ezra Donellan – vocals 
 Samia Finnerty – vocals 
 Chris Gehringer – mastering
 JJ Kirkpatrick – trumpet 
 Ruth Kornblatt-Stier – cello 
 Emelia Suljic – violin 
 Joe Zook – mixing

Charts

Weekly charts

Year-end charts

References

2019 albums
AJR (band) albums